is a Japanese voice actress from Iwaki, Fukushima. She is affiliated with Production Ace.

Biography
Bridcutt was born to a Japanese mother and Australian father. In the first grade of elementary school, she saw Detective Conan and admired Minami Takayama, who played Conan Edogawa, then deciding to become a voice actress. She started acting in high school and, after graduating, Bridcutt entered the Theater Department at Nihon University College of Art. She became a scholarship student when she was in her third year of college and began attending the Production Ace Acting Research Institute.

In 2013, she made her debut by voicing Asuka Kudō in Problem Children Are Coming from Another World, Aren't They?.

Filmography

Anime
2013
 Red Data Girl (Jean Honoka Kisaragi)
 Majestic Prince (Shion Natori)
 Fate/kaleid liner Prisma Illya (Magical Bushidō Musashi)
 Blood Lad (Bell Hydra)
 Problem Children are Coming from Another World, aren't they? (Asuka Kudō)

2014
 Chaika - The Coffin Princess (Selma Kenworth)
 Dai-Shogun - Great Revolution (Hijikata Toshizō)
 Date A Live II (Yuzuru Yamai)
 Pri Para (Eiko)

2015
 Aria the Scarlet Ammo AA (Urara Takachiho)
 Isuca (Kanae)
 Kantai Collection (Yūbari)
 The Testament of Sister New Devil (Yuki Nonaka)
 Yu-Gi-Oh! Arc-V (Rin)

2016
 Haruchika (Chika Homura)
 Ange Vierge (Nya Lapucea)

2017
 Chaos;Child (Nono Kurusu)
 Two Car (Chiyuki Shiohara)

2019
 The Rising of the Shield Hero (Myne)
 Date A Live III (Yuzuru Yamai)
 Hulaing Babies (Nagisa)

2020
 ID - Invaded (Sarina Togo)
 Hulaing Babies☆Petit (Nagisa)
 Monster Girl Doctor (Tisalia Scythia)

2021
 Cells at Work! Code Black (Liver Cell)
Redo of Healer (Myrrh)
 Komi Can't Communicate (Akako Onigashima)

2022
 Date A Live IV (Yuzuru Yamai)
 The Rising of the Shield Hero Season 2 (Myne)

2023
 The Legend of Heroes: Trails of Cold Steel – Northern War (Iseria Frost)

Films
2019
Grisaia: Phantom Trigger the Animation (Choco & Vanilla Inagaki)

Video games
2013
 Kantai Collection (Hatsukaze, Kumano, Maikaze, Suzuya, Yūbari)
2015
 Gothic wa Mahou Otome (Lily)
 Disgaea 5: Alliance of Vengeance (Seraphina)
 Shironeko Project (Carolyn Gambit)
2018
 The King of Fighters XIV (Blue Mary)
 The King of Fighters All Star (Blue Mary)
2019
 Fate/Grand Order (Salome)
 Starlink: Battle for Atlas (Chase da Silva)
2020
 Fire Emblem: Three Houses (Cindered Shadows (DLC) (Constance)) 
 Grimms Notes (Jagd-Hund)
2021
 Gate of Nightmares (Beatrix, Serena)
2022
 The King of Fighters XV (Blue Mary)
 Trek to Yomi (Aiko)

Dubbing

Live-action
 American Horror Story: Murder House (Violet Harmon (Taissa Farmiga))
 Bizaardvark (Amelia Duckworth (DeVore Ledridge))
 Black Christmas (Marty (Lily Donoghue))
 Blood Father (Lydia Link (Erin Moriarty))
 Celeste and Jesse Forever (Riley Banks (Emma Roberts))
 Death Wish (Jordan Kersey (Camila Morrone))
 Happiest Season (Harper (Mackenzie Davis))
 High Strung (Jazzy (Sonoya Mizuno))
 The Last Duel (Marguerite de Carrouges (Jodie Comer))
 L.M. Montgomery's Anne of Green Gables (Josie Pye (Stefani Kimber))
 The Missing (Alice Webster (Abigail Hardingham))
 Twixt (Virginia "V" (Elle Fanning))

Animation
 Casper's Scare School (Monaco)
 Sofia the First (Princess Cleo)

References

External links
  
 Official agency profile 
 

1989 births
Living people
Japanese people of Australian descent
Japanese video game actresses
Japanese voice actresses
Nihon University alumni
Voice actresses from Fukushima Prefecture
21st-century Japanese actresses